Obingwa is a Local Government Area of Abia State, Nigeria. Its headquarters are in the town of Mgboko.

It has an area of 395 km and a population of 181,439 at the 2006 census.

The postal code of the area is 453.

Populated areas

 Mgboko
 Abayi Okoroato
 Abala-Ibeme
 Mgboko Ngwa
 Ohanze
 Owoelu
 Ndiakata
 Nlagu
 Oberete 
 Umuoha
 Obete-Ukwu
 Onicha-Ngwa
 Umuiroma

See also
 List of villages in Abia State

References

External links

Local Government Areas in Abia State